The 2007–08 Copa Federación de España is the 15th staging of the Copa Federación de España, a knockout competition for Spanish football clubs in Segunda División B and Tercera División.

The competition began on 4 August 2007 and ended with the finals on 27 March and 3 April 2008.

Andalusia tournament

Final

|}

Asturias tournament

Qualifying tournament

Group A

Group B

Group C

Group D

Semifinals

|}

Final

Aragon tournament

Quarter-finals

|}

Semifinals

|}

Final

|}

Balearic Islands tournament

Semifinals

|}

Final

|}

Canary Islands tournament

Semifinals

|}

Final

|}

Cantabria tournament

Qualifying round

|}

Semifinals

|}

Final

|}

Castile and León tournament

Qualifying tournament

|}

Final

Catalonia tournament

Qualifying round

|}

Final

|}

Euskadi tournament

Final

|}

Extremadura tournament

Final

|}

Galicia tournament

Qualifying round

|}

Semifinals

|}

Final

|}

La Rioja tournament

Qualifying

Semifinals

Final

Madrid tournament

Qualifying tournament

Group A

Group B

Final

|}

Murcia tournament

Qualifying tournament

Group A

Group B

|}

Final

Navarre tournament

Qualifying tournament

Group A

Group B

Final

Valencia tournament

Final

|}

National tournament

National Qualifying round

|}

Round of 32

|}

Round of 16

|}

Quarter-finals

|}

Semifinals

|}

Final

|}

Copa Federación de España seasons
Fed
Copa
Copa